The Rendezvous Mountain Trail is a  long hiking trail in Grand Teton National Park in the U.S. state of Wyoming. Most often used to descend from the top of Rendezvous Mountain after riding the Jackson Hole Mountain Resort ski lift to the top of the peak, the trail descends  to junction with the Granite Canyon Trail adjacent to the Upper Granite Canyon Patrol Cabin.

See also
List of hiking trails in Grand Teton National Park

References

Hiking trails of Grand Teton National Park